Pinky Lai (賴平, born 20 March 1951) is an automotive designer. Lai is noted for his design work at Ford, BMW, and Porsche AG.

During Lai's tenure at Porsche from January 1989 until his retirement in 2014, he was chief designer responsible for the exterior designs of 996 series of the Porsche 911 as well as both the Porsche 987 Boxster and Cayman.

Background 
Born and raised in Quarry Bay, Hong Kong, Lai moved to Rome in 1972, where he studied and received a BA in industrial design at the Istituto Superiore per le Industrie Artistiche. After seeing an opening for car designer at Ford of Germany, in 1978 Lai received a two-year full scholarship for master's degree study on transportation design at the RCA Royal College of Art in London.

In 1980, winner and recipient of the John Ogier Memorial Design Bursary of the Royal Society of Arts.

Career 
After his graduation from RCA in 1980, he started working for the Fordwerke in Cologne, Germany. In 1982–83 he went on a joint venture project to work in Ghia Studios (Italy) and Mazda in Japan, where he worked on a specialty car program as a result of winning the internal competition. He worked on the Sierra, Fiesta, Escort, and Scorpio projects.

After returning to Germany, he joined BMW in 1984 as a senior designer. He won the design of E36 program (the BMW 3 Series). In 1989, he was invited by the president of R&D of Porsche AG to join the design team Porsche Styling as studio chief. Since then, he has worked on all the models from the factory, from the Boxster to the Cayman, including the revolutionary 996, the first major departure from Ferdinand Alexander "Butzi" Porsche's original design for the 911 in four decades.

Between 1992 and 1995, every Saturday he taught design sketching at the Art Center College of Design in La Tour-de-Peilz, Switzerland.

Since 2004, he was appointed the chief designer for all external projects at Porsche Styling, handling all transportation design for clients from Japan, Korea, China, and Europe. Projects ranged from high-performance motor bike design to design face-lifting of an over-300-meter-long cruise liner.

Awards 

 1997   911 Carrera   L´Automobile Piu Bella Del Mondo, Milan;
 1998   911 C4 Carrera   L´Automobile Piu Bella Del Mondo, Milan;
 1998   911 Carrera    Design Zentrum Nordrhein-Westfalen, Germany;
 1998   911 Carrera   Chicago Athenaeum; Museum of Architecture, Usa;
 2000   911 Turbo    L´Automobile Piu Bella Del Mondo, Milan;
 2000   911 Turbo    Industrie Forum Design Hanover, Germany;
 2000   911 Carrera(Fl)   Autonis (Berlin), Germany;
 2001   911 Turbo   Design Zentrum Nordrhein_Westfalen, Germany;
 2001   911 Carrera   L´Automobile Piu Bella Del Mondo, Milan;
 2002   911 Turbo   German Design Council;
2001   911 C4s Cabriolet   L´Automobile Piu Bella Del Mondo, Milan;
 December 2015   Recipient of Lifetime Achievement Award by Hong Kong Design Centre.

Speeches 

Invitations as key-note speaker and distinguished speaker:

 November 2012  WPO (Hong Kong chapter);
 July 2013      Moet Hennessy Gala-Dinner, Taipei, Taiwan;
 April 2014     Oklahoma State University, school of Architecture;
 October 2014    Hong Kong University; Entrepreneurs Organization; Hong Kong Polytechnic university; Stanford University Alumni; Columbia University Alumni; Hong Kong Chinese University;
 December 2015  The Hong Kong University of Science & Technology;
 April 2017    Shanghai Jiao Tong University and Fudan university;
 June 2022  Keynote Speaker at the Royal College of Art China Forum with over 3 million of audience via Zoom; 
 July 2022  Invitation by the Royal College of Art Students and Scholars Association (RCACSSA) to hold the Lifetime Honorary Chairman of the Royal College of Art Chinese Alumni Association.

Consultancies 

 Residential building design Concept consultancy project for a 7-Stars Sun Hung Kai Properties, Hong Kong

References

External links 
 

Chinese automobile designers
Living people
BMW designers
Porsche people
1951 births